Ermin Hasić (born 19 May 1975) is a Bosnian-Slovenian retired footballer of Bosnian descent who played as a goalkeeper.

Honours
Koper
Slovenian Championship: 2009–10
Slovenian Cup: 2006–07, 2014–15 
Slovenian Supercup: 2010

References

External links
NZS profile 

1975 births
Living people
Sportspeople from Koper
Slovenian footballers
Association football goalkeepers
Slovenian PrvaLiga players
FC Koper players
NK Olimpija Ljubljana (1945–2005) players
Slovenian expatriate footballers
Slovenian expatriate sportspeople in Germany
Expatriate footballers in Germany
2. Bundesliga players
SpVgg Unterhaching players